Bryotropha wolschrijni is a moth of the family Gelechiidae. It is found in mountainous areas of Spain and Morocco.

The wingspan is 14–15 mm. The forewings are mixed with brown and dark greyish brown scales. The base has a black blotch on the costa. The hindwings are pale brown at the base, but much darker towards the apex. Adults have been recorded on wing from June to July and in late September.

Etymology
The species is named in honour of Mr. J. Wolschrijn.

References

Moths described in 2005
wolschrijni
Moths of Europe
Moths of Africa